The Canadian federal budget for fiscal year 1971-1972 was presented by Minister of Finance Edgar Benson in the House of Commons of Canada on 18 June 1971. The budget lowered income taxes on individual and corporations, and sale taxes on a variety of commodities. A Capital gains tax was also introduced to the Canadian tax code.

Reception 
The budget initially received mixed reviews. Spokespersons for all three opposition parties were displeased by the budget and criticized the lack of measures to counter umemployment. However, Progressive Conservative MP Robert Thompson responded especially favourably to the budget, praising its tax cuts.

A July 1971 Gallup opinion poll asked "Do you think the last federal budget, presented to parliament in mid-june will effect, in any direct way, the financial situation of yourself and your family?" 60% of respondents said "No" while 40% said "yes".

External links 

 Budget Speech

References

Canadian budgets
1971 in Canadian law
1971 government budgets
1971 in Canadian politics